Roger Harris is an American former Negro league outfielder who played in the 1940s.

Harris played for the Birmingham Black Barons in 1942. In 11 recorded games, he posted six hits in 34 plate appearances.

References

External links
 and Seamheads

Year of birth missing
Place of birth missing
Birmingham Black Barons players
Baseball outfielders